Orange Township is a township in Clinton County, Iowa, USA.  As of the 2000 census, its population was 1,253.

History
Orange Township was organized in 1846. It was first known as Union Township until 1854, when the name was changed to its present form.

Geography
According to the USGS, it contains five cemeteries: Allison, Barber, Calvary, Evergreen and Smith.

The stream of Barber Creek runs through this township.

Notes

References
 USGS Geographic Names Information System (GNIS)

External links
 US-Counties.com
 City-Data.com

Townships in Clinton County, Iowa
Townships in Iowa
1846 establishments in Iowa Territory